Kay Patterson (born January 11, 1931) is an American politician who was a Democratic member of the South Carolina Senate, representing the 19th District from 1985 to his retirement in 2008. He was previously a member of the South Carolina House of Representatives from 1975 through 1985.

Patterson was born in Darlington County on January 11, 1931, the son of James and Leila Patterson, and was raised in Darlington and Sumter Counties by his grandmothers, Mrs. Meta B. Patterson and Mrs. Emma Joseph. He graduated from Lincoln High in Sumter, South Carolina, in 1949. Senator Patterson attended Claflin College, now Claflin University, in 1949-1951. After he served in the United States Marine Corps from 1951 to 1953 as sergeant, he completed requirements for the baccalaureate degree in Social Sciences at Allen University in 1956. He pursued additional education at Temple University and attended an NDEA Institute in Black History at Atlanta University in 1963. He received the Masters of Education Degree from South Carolina State College in 1971.

Senator Patterson taught for fourteen years at W. A. Perry Middle School, C. A. Johnson Preparatory Academy, and Benedict College, and served for 16 years as a UniServ Representative for the South Carolina Education Association, from which he retired in June 1986. He is a member of St. Luke’s Episcopal Church where he has served as Senior Warden of the Vestry, Secretary and Treasurer of the Vestry.

Senator Patterson is active in many civic and community organizations which include the North Columbia Civic Club and life membership in the NAACP. While a student at Claflin College (1949–1951), he joined the Omega Psi Phi fraternity and Edisto Lodge No. 39 Prince-Hall Masons. He served as a Commissioner on the Education Commission of the States, as a member of the State Reorganization Commission, and a member of the Southern Regional Education Board (SREB). In January 1983, he was elected by the S. C. House Education Committee to serve on the University of South Carolina Trustee Board, the first Black to serve on the Board since Reconstruction. Senator Patterson has been an outspoken legislator championing the cause of the poor and downtrodden. He was elected to the South Carolina House of Representatives in 1974, and to the Senate in 1985. In 1990, he served as Chairman of the South Carolina Legislative Black Caucus.

As an outspoken and fiery speaker in his practice of politics, he has been a moving force in promoting and effectuating change in the state of South Carolina. He had long been a proponent for removal of the Confederate flag from the South Carolina State House dome.

He was a member of the S. C. Senate from Richland County District #19, serving on the following committees: Banking & Insurance, Corrections & Penology, Education, Finance, and Transportation. Senator Patterson also served as Commissioner for the South Carolina Department of Highways & Public Transportation, and as Chairman of the Richland County Legislative Delegation.

He is married to Jean James of Pinewood, South Carolina, has two children — Eric and Pamela, and a grandson Eric Jr., and granddaughters, Ashley and Courtland. In 2008 Senator Patterson retired and was replaced by former State Representative John L. Scott Jr., who won a close fought victory (77 Votes to be exact) against Richland One School Board Chairmen, Vince Ford. Patterson was inducted into the Richland One Hall of Fame in 2007. In 2016, a historical marker honoring his birthplace, Round O in Darlington County, was unveiled. Also in 2016, Patterson received the inaugural Clementa C. Pinckney award from the South Carolina Legislative Black Caucus.

References

External links

South Carolina Legislature - Senator Kay Patterson official SC Senate website
Project Vote Smart - Senator Kay Patterson (SC) profile
Follow the Money - Kay Patterson
2006 2004 2002 2000 campaign contributions
Honoree Senator Kay Patterson at South Carolina African American History, June 2003
Senator Kay Patterson Oral History Interview, University of South Carolina, June 23, 2008

South Carolina state senators
Members of the South Carolina House of Representatives
1931 births
Living people
Allen University alumni
People from Darlington, South Carolina
Politicians from Columbia, South Carolina